CJK Compatibility Ideographs is a Unicode block created to contain Han characters that were encoded in multiple locations in other established character encodings, in addition to their CJK Unified Ideographs assignments, in order to retain round-trip compatibility between Unicode and those encodings. Such encodings include the South Korean KS X 1001:1998 (U+F900–U+FA0B, 268 characters), Taiwanese Big5 (U+FA0C–U+FA0D, 2 characters), Japanese IBM 32 (CP932 variant; U+FA0E–U+FA2D, 32 characters), South Korean KS X 1001:2004 (U+FA2E–U+FA2F, 2 character), Japanese JIS X 0213 (U+FA30–U+FA6A, 59 characters), Japanese ARIB STD-B24 (U+FA6B–U+FA6D, 3 characters) and the North Korean KPS 10721-2000 (U+FA70–U+FAD9, 106 characters) source standards.

In ensuing versions of the standard, more characters have been added to the block. These even include a few regular ideographs (with the Unified_Ideograph property) that do not have duplicates (U+FA0E–U+FA0F, U+FA11, U+FA13–U+FA14, U+FA1F, U+FA21, U+FA23–U+FA24 and U+FA27–U+FA29).

The block has dozens of ideographic variation sequences registered in the Unicode Ideographic Variation Database (IVD).
These sequences specify the desired glyph variant for a given Unicode character.

Block

History
The following Unicode-related documents record the purpose and process of defining specific characters in the CJK Compatibility Ideographs block:

See also 
 CJK Compatibility Ideographs Supplement

References 

Unicode blocks